Battle Monument is a large Tuscan column monument located on Trophy Point at the United States Military Academy, West Point, New York, designed by Stanford White.

History
The site for the monument was dedicated on 15 June 1864 by General George McClellan where he gave a lengthy address and stated that, "The site of the Battle Monument is dedicated in commemoration of the Officers and Privates of the regular Army who have died in the present war". His speech was followed by rapturous applause after concluding it with the official dedication stating, "We now dedicate this site to the memory of brave men, loyalty, patriotism and honor."

The monument itself was dedicated on 30 May 1897 by surviving American Civil War veterans. The monument was financed by monthly contributions from the pay of the officers and soldiers of the Regular Army. Inscribed on bronze straps belting the eight monumental "cannon balls"  circling the column are the names of 2,230 Regular Army officers and soldiers who died for the Union during the Civil War.

A female statue designed by Frederick MacMonnies sits atop the monument, representing Fame.  The statue that now tops the monument is actually the second version of the statue.  Just months after it was unveiled, MacMonnies agreed to replace the original statue after complaints that it was too large and awkward.

Traditionally, the plebes at West Point made reference to the statue of Fame when giving the following reply to any upperclassman demanding to know "How are they all?":  "They are all fickle but one, sir." "Who is the one?" "She who stands atop Battle Monument, for she has been on the same shaft since 1897;" however, this is no longer current practice.

Image gallery

Sources

References

External links

 Save Outdoor Sculptures!
 Photographs and architectural sketches of the Battle Monument, Battle Monument plans on page 76.

1897 sculptures
Bronze sculptures in New York (state)
Buildings and structures completed in 1897
Monuments and memorials at West Point
Statues in New York (state)
1897 establishments in New York (state)